Dupasquier is a surname. Notable people with the surname include:

Ivan Dupasquier (born 1961), Swiss tennis player
Jason Dupasquier (2001–2021), Swiss motorcycle rider
Pierre Dupasquier (born 1937), French engineer
Philippe Dupasquier (born 1955), author and illustrator